The 2010 Categoria Primera A season was the 63rd season of Colombia's top-flight football league. Because of new sponsorship, it was officially called the 2010 Liga Postobón season.

Format 
The Assembly of DIMAYOR established a new system of competition on December 10, 2009.

Apertura
The First Stage of the Apertura was a single round-robin tournament in 18 dates. The top four teams at the end of this stage advanced to the semifinals an pitted into two ties: 1 vs. 4 and 2 vs. 3. The winners of the semifinals contested the finals.

Finalización
The Finalizacion was the same as the previous season.

Teams

Campeonato Apertura
The Liga Postobon I was scheduled to begin on January 31, 2010.

First stage

Standings

Results

Semifinals
The four qualified teams from the first stage were placed into two semifinals labelled "Semifinal A" and "Semifinal B". Each semifinal was played on a home and away basis. The teams that made up each semifinal were determined by their first stage standings: Semifinal A was between the teams that finished 1st and 4th; Semifinal B was between the teams that finished 2nd and 3rd. The team in each semifinal that finished higher in the table played the second leg at home. The winner of each semifinal advanced to the Finals.

Semifinal A

Semifinal B

Finals

Top goalscorers

Source:

Statistics
Total goals: 457
Longest winning streak: 6 games — Deportes Tolima (March 20–April 17)
Longest unbeaten streak: 10 games — Independiente Medellín (February 18–April 11);La Equidad (March 28–May 26)
Longest losing streak: 8 games — Deportes Quindío (February 17–April 17)
Biggest home win: Once Caldas 5–1 Deportivo Pereira (March 21)
Biggest away win: Envigado 1–7 Independiente Medellín (March 28)
Highest scoring: Envigado 1–7 Independiente Medellín (March 28)

Campeonato Finalización
The Liga Postobon II began on July 17 and is ended on December 19.

First stage

Standings

Results

Cuadrangular semifinals

Group A

Group B

Finals

Top goalscorers

Source:

Statistics
Total goals: 498 goals
Longest winning streak: 5 games — Millonarios (September 25–October 24); Deportes Tolima (September 25–October 22)
Longest unbeaten streak: 15 games — Once Caldas (September 12–December 18)
Longest losing streak: 7 games — Envigado (July 18–August 29)
Biggest home win: Millonarios 4–0 Real Cartagena
Biggest away win: Real Cartagena 1–4 Deportes Tolima
Highest scoring: Deportivo Cali 6–3 América

Aggregate table

Relegation table 
Relegation was determined through an average of the points earn in the First Stages of the three season. For the purposes of the table, the 2009 Primera B winner (Cortuluá) entered with the same points as the team that was 16th in the beginning of the season (Real Cartagena). The team with the lowest average was relegated to the Categoría Primera B for the following season, and the team with the next lowest average played a playoff match against the 2010 Primera B runner-up.

Source: DIMAYOR Rules for classification: 1st average; 2nd goal difference; 3rd goals scored; 4th away goals for; 5th away goals against; 6th draw.

Relegation/promotion playoff

References

External links 
 DIMAYOR's official website 

2010
Col
1